Caralee is a given name, a female variant of Charles. Notable people with the name include:

 Caralee McElroy (born 1983), American musician 
 Caralee McLiesh, Australian economist

See also

 Carlee
 Carolee

Feminine given names